Carl W. Soderstrom (December 14, 1915 – January 13, 2009) was an American politician who served as a Republican member of the Illinois House of Representatives.

Biography
The son of Reuben Soderstrom and Jeanne Shaw, Carl Soderstrom was born December 14, 1915 in Streator, Illinois. After graduating from Streator Township High School, he earned a Bachelor of Science at the University of Illinois at Urbana–Champaign and a Juris Doctor at the University of Illinois College of Law. During World War II, he worked at the shipyards in Seneca, Illinois. A lifelong Republican, he was elected to the Illinois House of Representatives in 1950. He and his wife Virginia had five children. He died January 13, 2009.

References

1915 births
2009 deaths
People from Streator, Illinois
University of Illinois Urbana-Champaign alumni
University of Illinois College of Law alumni
Republican Party members of the Illinois House of Representatives
20th-century American politicians
Illinois lawyers
20th-century American lawyers